Ladoon Mein Palli (or Raised in Love) is a Pakistani drama series which originally aired on Geo Entertainment in 2014. The serial is produced by A&B Productions whereas it is written by Adam Aazeen and directed by Waseem Abbas.

Plot
Laraib is a beautiful young woman in a loving family who meets a stylist named Wahaj and they fall in love and eventually marry. However, Wahaj is also loved by his cousin, Bishma, who has loved him since they were children. Wahaj does not feel the same about Bishma but she is determined to split him from Laraib so she can have him to herself.

Cast 
 Maya Ali As Laraib
 Affan Waheed as Wahaj
 Nadia Afgan as Samreen (Wahaj's mother)
 Ali Abbas as Irfaan (Laraib's cousin brother, Farooq and Bilquees's son)
 Sajal Ali as Bisma (Wahaj's cousin and interested in him)
 Waseem Abbas as Laraib's Father
 Shaista Jabeen as Laraib's Mother
 Usman Peerzada as Farooq (Laraib's uncle a.k.a. Bade Papa)
 Asma Abbas as Bilquees (Laraib's aunt a.k.a. Badi Ammi)
 Kinza Malik as Bisma's mother
 Sumbul Shahid as Bilquees's sister (Irfaan and Furqan's aunt, Farooq's sister-in-law)
 Hareb Farooq as Furqan (Laraib's cousin brother, Farooq and Bilquees's son)
 Nasreen Qureshi as Bibi Jaan
 Ali Anjum as Johnny
 Tahira Imam
 Jibran Shahid

Broadcast
The serial originally aired in Pakistan on Geo TV in 2014. Later in 2015, serial was aired in India under the title "Sabki Laadli Laraib" on Zindagi. In 2016, it had a re-run on Geo Tv under the title "Jalan". It has also been broadcast several times on Geo Kahani. It is digitally available for streaming on YouTube, where it has million of views.

References

External links 
Official site
Ladon Mein Pali-IMDb

Geo TV original programming
Pakistani drama television series
Pakistani telenovelas